Leif Georg Nysmed (born 1970) is a Swedish politician and member of the Riksdag, the national legislature. A member of the Social Democratic Party, he has represented Stockholm County since September 2014.

Nysmed is the son of Jan Nyberg and Ann-Britt Nyberg Östergaard. He was educated in Långholmen.

References

1970 births
Living people
Members of the Riksdag 2014–2018
Members of the Riksdag 2018–2022
Members of the Riksdag 2022–2026
Members of the Riksdag from the Social Democrats